Los Banos, alternatively Los Baños, is a city in Merced County, California, United States. It is located in the San Joaquin Valley in central California, near the junction of State Route 152 and Interstate 5.  Its population was 45,532 at the 2020 census, up from 35,972 at the 2010 census. The city is served by Los Banos Municipal Airport for air transport access.

Etymology  
The town's Spanish name Los Baños means "the baths"; it is named after a spring that feeds natural wetlands in the western San Joaquín Valley.  Its official spelling, reflected in the name of its post office, omits the tilde of the ñ, though some signs in town show its name as Los Baños.

Geography 
The city is at the intersection of California State Route 152 and California State Route 165.  to the west is Interstate 5, which extends north–south between Canada and Mexico. The San Luis Reservoir and the Diablo Range are farther to the west.

Los Banos sits on the southwestern edge of extensive national and state game refuges; these wetlands support waterfowl and other wildlife habitat along a stretch of the San Joaquin River that still carries water and the Grassland Ecological Area, home to rare California grasslands habitat. The San Luis National Wildlife Refuge Complex includes San Luis National Wildlife Refuge, which includes the Kesterson Unit, East Bear Creek, West Bear Creek, and Blue Goose Unit. Nearby are the Merced National Wildlife Refuge and the San Joaquin River National Wildlife Refuge. Fishers, hunters, birdwatchers, and other recreational users come to Los Banos year round.

Climate 
Los Banos has a semiarid climate (Köppen climate classification: Bsk) with cool winters and hot summers. Most of the precipitation falls in the winter. Gusty winds are common in the late afternoon, especially in the vicinity of nearby Pacheco Pass.

On average, 96.9 days have highs of 90 °F (32 °C) or higher, and 29.4 days have lows of 32 °F (0 °C) or lower.

Although snow is rare,  fell in January 1916 and  fell in January 1962.

Demographics

2021 
In 2021, the population of Los Banos is estimated to have been around 46,398 inhabitants.

2010
At the 2010 census, Los Banos had a population of 35,972. The racial makeup of Los Banos was 20,846 (58.0%) White, 1,354 (3.8%) African American, 512 (1.4%) Native American, 1,162 (3.2%) Asian, 134 (0.4%) Pacific Islander, 10,123 (28.1%) from other races, and 1,841 (5.1%) from two or more races. Hispanics or Latinos of any race were 23,346 persons (64.9%).

The census reported that 35,791 people (99.5% of the population) lived in households, 103 (0.3%) lived in noninstitutionalized group quarters, and 78 (0.2%) were institutionalized.

Of the 10,259 households, 5,451 (53.1%) had children under 18 living in them, 6,018 (58.7%) were opposite-sex married couples living together, 1,474 (14.4%) had a female householder with no husband present, 838 (8.2%) had a male householder with no wife present, 791 were (7.7%) unmarried opposite-sex partnerships, 78 (0.8%) were same-sex married couples or partnerships, and 1,551 households (15.1%) were one person and 653 (6.4%) had someone living alone who was 65 or older. The average household size was 3.49. There were 8,330 families (81.2% of households); the average family size was 3.84.

The age distribution was 12,102 people (33.6%) under 18, 3,703 people (10.3%) from 18 to 24, 9,596 people (26.7%) from 25 to 44, 7,494 people (20.8%) from 45 to 64, and 3,077 people (8.6%) who were 65 or older. The median age was 29.8 years. For every 100 females, there were 99.2 males. For every 100 females 18 and over, there were 96.0 males.

The 11,375 housing units had an average density of 1,124.4 per square mile, of the occupied units 6,197 (60.4%) were owner-occupied and 4,062 (39.6%) were rented. The homeowner vacancy rate was 4.1%; the rental vacancy rate was 8.4%. 20,687 people (57.5% of the population) lived in owner-occupied housing units and 15,104 people (42.0%) lived in rental housing units.

2000

At the 2000 census there were 25,869 people in 7,721 households, including 6,223 families, in the city. The racial makeup of the city was 58.61% White, 4.25% African American, 1.35% Native American, 2.34% Asian, 0.33% Pacific Islander, 26.90% from other races, and 6.21% from two or more races. Hispanic or Latino of any race were 50.44%.

Of the 7,721 households, 48.9% had children under the age of 18 living with them, 62.5% were married couples living together, 12.4% had a female householder with no husband present, and 19.4% were non-families. Of all households, 15.8% were one person and 7.0% were one person aged 65 or older. The average household size was 3.33 and the average family size was 3.69.

The age distribution was 35.1% under 18, 8.9% from 18 to 24, 29.9% from 25 to 44, 16.8% from 45 to 64, and 9.3% 65 or older. The median age was 30 years. For every 100 females, there were 99.0 males. For every 100 females age 18 and over, there were 96.0 males.

The median household income was $43,690 and the median family income was $45,304. Males had a median income of $38,294 versus $27,994 for females. The per capita income for the city was $15,582. About 9.8% of families and 12.1% of the population were below the poverty line, including 13.9% of those under age 18 and 9.8% of those age 65 or over.

Government 

As of 2022, Paul Llanez is the mayor.

History and culture 

The Los Banos area was initially settled, according to Mexican land-grant records, in the 1840s. The first white settler in the area was Uriah Wood, who built his two-room cabin in 1859. The original site of Los Banos was located several miles from the current town center, about a mile and half west of the railroad near present-day Volta.  The town was essentially a trading post and received its name when the post office was established and the Post Office Department designated the office "Los Banos" after the nearby creek.  When the railroad arrived, Los Banos relocated to its present-day site.
The first post office opened in 1873.

Land and water rights were important to early Los Banos residents, but those rights were recognized only when the land and deed were registered.  Sometimes, those rights depended on fleet footedness, as it did in the "race" between Los Banos residents Uriah Wood and Henry Miller.  Wood, whose homestead was located off of Badger Flat Road, raced Miller to the land office in Stockton to insure his claim to the land would be recognized.  After crossing the San Joaquin River, Wood paid the ferryman $5 to hold the boat on the east side of the river to insure he would gain sufficient distance from Miller to ensure he would reach the land office first.  Wood succeeded and the seven sections that he registered cost him only 45¢ an acre.

The centerpiece of downtown Los Banos is Henry Miller Plaza, honoring early California rancher Henry Miller. The  half-oval public plaza features a monumental scale bronze arrangement of Miller with cattle. At one time in the late 19th century, Miller was the largest land owner in the United States. The success of his business monopolized the California agricultural industry, funneling resources and supplies to create his prosperous company. Centered around cattle farming, the Miller and Lux Corporation ultimately transformed the San Joaquin Valley into what can be considered as a precursor to corporate farming and turning independent farmers into wageworkers. His company, the Miller & Lux Corporation, was headquartered in Los Banos on a site currently housing the Mexican restaurant España's and the Canal Farm Inn.

Los Banos has a long history of Portuguese and Spanish immigrants, as do many of the nearby towns on the west side of the San Joaquin Valley. This is reflected both in local restaurants and in several festivals and parades that take place during the year. There is also a significant community of Basques. Los Banos is locally known for its annual May Day Fair during the first week of May.

Los Banos is home to The Randall Fawcett House, a Frank Lloyd Wright designed Usonian home.

A member of the Manson family, Susan Atkins attended Los Banos High School, before joining the family.

Since the 1980s, the city's population has changed with a continuing influx of people who work in the San Jose/Silicon Valley area but seek more affordable housing and slower pace of  semi-rural life, a pattern seen in many other small towns within commuting distance of Silicon Valley.

 California Historical Landmark Canal Farm Inn is located at 1460 E Pacheco Blvd, Los Banos. Canal Farm Inn is a California Historical Landmarks, number 548. 
The California Historical Landmark reads:
NO. 548 CANAL FARM INN - This original San Joaquin Valley ranch headquarters of California pioneer and cattle baron Henry Miller (1827-1916) was established in 1873. His farsighted planning and development in the 1870s of a vast gravity irrigation system, and the founding of Los Banos in 1889, provided the basis for this area's present stability and wealth.

Notable people 
 Mack Wheat, (1893–1979), was a Major League Baseball catcher from 1915 to 1921 for Brooklyn and the Philadelphia Phillies.

Education
K–12 education is provided by the Los Banos Unified School District. In addition, the Los Banos Campus of Merced College has served community college students since 2007.

Economy

Top employers
According to the city's 2018 Comprehensive Annual Financial Report, the top employers in the city are:

References

External links 

 

 
1907 establishments in California
Cities in Merced County, California
San Joaquin Valley
Incorporated cities and towns in California
Populated places established in 1907